Kathleen O'Connor may refer to:
 Kathleen O'Connor (politician) (1934–2017), Irish Clann na Poblachta politician
 Kathleen O'Connor (painter) (1876–1968), impressionist painter in Western Australia and France
 Kathleen O'Connor (actress) (1894–1957), American actress
 Kathleen M. O'Connor, American Old Testament scholar